Bethan Gwanas (real name Bethan Evans; born 16 January 1962) is a popular contemporary Welsh author, who publishes almost exclusively in the Welsh language. A prolific writer, she has had 17 titles published in the last decade. Whilst not just a fiction writer, she has written novels for teenagers and Welsh learners, though most of her recent work has been for adults.

She graduated in French from Aberystwyth University, and in 1985 she won the Crown at the Urdd Eisteddfod. Having lived for periods in places as diverse as Bethesda, Cardiff, Nigeria and France, she has returned to Rhydymain, very close to her childhood roots.

She grew up in Brithdir, near Dolgellau in North Wales, and on transferring to secondary school attended Ysgol y Gader, Dolgellau.

Professional background
Before achieving success as an author, Gwanas worked as a teacher, was deputy head at the Urdd Centre at Glan-llyn, near Bala), and also a research assistant and producer on Radio Cymru.

In 2003 she gave up her job as a literature promoter with Gwynedd Council to concentrate full-time on her writing.

Her second book, a factual account of her experiences whilst working with VSO in Nigeria, was published in 1997. Since then she has had work aired on radio and TV, and her first book Amdani! (Go for it!) – a novel about a women's rugby team – inspired six series on S4C. Gwanas wrote all but the last 3 series. Following the success of Amdani she also wrote a stage play (written with Script Cymru, and including music and songs), where the publicity describes it as "Sex, mud and rugby from a female perspective." For this, Script Cymru received a major ACW Audience Development Award for work in the Welsh language.

She has won two annual Tir na n-Og Awards for Welsh-language children's fiction (for Llinyn Trôns in 2001 and Sgôr in 2003). This prize is awarded annually by the Welsh Books Council.

Her novel Hi yw fy Ffrind (She is my friend) reached the shortlist for Llyfr y Flwyddyn (Book of the Year) in 2005.
'Ceri Grafu' is her first novel to be produced as a commercial audio book, but many of the others are available in audio format through the Gwynedd library service.

She is known for her informal style of writing, and her adult novels often contain sexual elements not normally associated with Welsh literature. Her novels also draw on some of her own experiences, such as when she worked in a library (as does Blodwen Jones in that trilogy) and her experiences of outdoor education (featured in Llinyn Trôns). She refuses to be drawn on the question of quite how autobiographical are the childhood elements of Hi yw fy Ffrind.

She has also developed something of a reputation as a Welsh Michael Palin following her two S4C series Ar y Lein (On the Line) and Ar y Lein Eto (On the Line Again), in which she twice circumnavigated the world (though not continuously – she returned home during breaks in the filming). In the first series (2004) she followed line of latitude 52° north, the second series (2006) following line of longitude 5° west. These specific lines of latitude and longitude were chosen because they pass through Wales. At times her travels necessarily took her off these lines for geographical or political reasons, and on occasions variations were also made for the sake of interest. She kept a diary on both these trips, which were subsequently published to accompany the TV series.  Her trips are characterised by falling in love with places to which she would dearly love to return some day.

For some years she has written a weekly column in Yr Herald Cymraeg, which is now published only on a Wednesday as an appendix to The Daily Post in North Wales. Her articles are known for their openness and honesty, and reveal much of Gwanas's private life. Some of these articles have also been published as compilations, namely as Byd Bethan (Bethan's World) (out of print) and as Mwy o Fyd Bethan (More of Bethan's World).

Gwanas was one of 10 contributors to the book Y Mynydd Hwn (On This Mountain), published in 2002, also available in English. This is a volume of pictures and essays on the mountains of Wales. Gwanas writes about Cadair Idris, the mountain on her doorstep.

Gwanas regularly guests on S4C and Radio Cymru, and also at literary events and workshops throughout Wales. She has written work for radio, and also for the stage, including an adaptation of Stags and Hens (by Willy Russell) into Welsh for Fran Wen theatre company, and an adaptation (in English) of Peter Pan for primary schools through the BBC's education department.

When asked which three words best described her, she replied "Brwdfrydig, Prysur, Aflonydd" (enthusiastic, busy, restless).

She names her favourite Welsh-language authors as Gareth F. Williams, Manon Steffan Ros, Islwyn Ffowc Elis and Geraint V Jones, and her favourite English-language authors as Roddy Doyle, Isabel Allende, JK Rowling and Barbara Kingsolver.

In February 2009 she featured in the second episode of Britain's Best Drives, talking about the Welsh language to the presenter, actor Richard Wilson, at Caernarfon.

Her published titles

 Her short story Gwlad y Gwalltiau Gwyllt was published in Stori Cyn Cysgu (2005), a collection by nine authors and four illustrators of bedtime stories for young children.  She also contributed a story to the sequel, Stori Cyn Cysgu: 2 (2008).
 She contributed two short stories to Tinboeth (2007), a collection of 10 erotic stories by nine prominent Welsh female authors.  The book itself does not identify which stories were written by whom, and although Gwanas would have been happy to put her name to her work, not all the contributors were willing to do so. The two stories Miss Huws and Dan y dŵr are unmistakably Gwanas's work. Although no credit is given in the book, she also acted as editor for this collection of stories. She edited the sequel, Tinboethach (2008), though did not contribute any stories to this.
 She contributed an item to Cofio Grav, a tribute volume of poems and essays to Ray Gravell, the Welsh rugby player, who died suddenly in 2007.
 She contributed to Honco! (2009), a compilation of stories for children aged 9–11.
 She contributed an item to Nain/Mam-gu (2010), a compilation about grandmothers.

The following table classifies her published titles by genre (listed in order of publication) :

Family background
Gwanas's real surname is Evans. She takes the name "Gwanas" (as did her father) from the home farm of that name, built in 1838.

Gwanas's grandparents lived at "Gwanas" from 1947 until 1971 when her grandfather decided to move to the nearby town of Dolgellau. In 1971, when she was nine, her parents moved in, having previously lived locally in Dolserau Terrace, Brithdir, and prior to that in a caravan behind the farm. As a child Gwanas shared the attic bedroom with her two sisters, the other bedrooms being used for bed & breakfast guests.

In 2006 her brother Geraint and his family took over Gwanas.

Her father, Tom Evans, a baritone, has twice won the Rhuban Glas (Blue Ribbon) at the National Eisteddfod, and has sung in venues across the world, including the Sydney Opera House. He has released two albums, entitled Ave Maria and Encore, which include songs recorded in a number of European languages.

References

External links
 
 Bethan Gwanas at  Arts Council of Wales

1962 births
20th-century Welsh novelists
21st-century Welsh novelists
20th-century Welsh women writers
21st-century Welsh women writers
21st-century Welsh writers
Welsh-language writers
Welsh children's writers
Welsh travel writers
British women travel writers
Living people
Welsh women novelists
Alumni of Aberystwyth University
BBC radio producers
Welsh columnists
Welsh women columnists
Women radio producers